The roads which were constructed by Rani Mangammal (1689–1704) are called as Rani Mangammal Salai.  The queen was a great administrator who is still widely remembered as a maker of roads and avenues, and a builder of temples, tanks and choultries with many of her public works still in use.

List of roads

The following roads were constructed during her administration and remembered by her name.

References

Madurai Nayak dynasty
Tirunelveli

hi:भारत के राजमार्ग
ta:இந்தியப் போக்குவரத்து வலையமைப்பு